Kelley Jones (born December 8, 1965) is an American rower. She competed in the women's eight event at the 1992 Summer Olympics.

References

External links
 

1965 births
Living people
American female rowers
Olympic rowers of the United States
Rowers at the 1992 Summer Olympics
Sportspeople from Houston
21st-century American women